Sir John Caines, KCB (born 1933) is a retired English civil servant. Educated at Christ Church, Oxford, he entered the civil service in 1957 as an official in the Ministry of Supply, subsequently serving in the Ministry of Aviation, the Board of Trade and its successors, and the Central Policy Review Staff. He was deputy secretary in the Department of Trade and Industry from 1983 to 1987. From 1987 to 1989, he was Permanent Secretary of the Overseas Development Administration at the Foreign and Commonwealth Office. He was Permanent Secretary of the Department of Education and Science from 1989 to 1992 and of its successor, the Department for Education, from 1992 to 1993.

References 

1933 births
Living people
English civil servants
Alumni of Christ Church, Oxford
Knights Companion of the Order of the Bath